Lyells is an unincorporated community in Richmond County, in the U.S. state of Virginia.

The Rochester House was listed on the National Register of Historic Places in 1991.

References

Unincorporated communities in Virginia
Unincorporated communities in Richmond County, Virginia